Lassana Samaké (born 8 December 1992) is a Malian footballer who plays for Onze Créateurs de Niaréla and Mali National team as Left Back or Left Midfielder.

Club career 
Samaké plays for Onze Créateurs de Niaréla, since 2010, in Malian Division 1.

He won the Mali Cup in 2014.

International career 
Lassana Samaké counts 8 selections in Mali national team. He played all the games of 2016 African Nations Championship, reached the final and made 3 assists. He was the revelation of this 2016 African Nations Championship.

References 

 " Lassana Samaké - footballdatabase ". footballdatabase.eu
 " Mali -  L.Samaké - Profile with news, career statistics and history - Soccerway". soccerway.com

External links 
 CHAN 2016 profile

1992 births
Living people
Malian footballers
AS Onze Créateurs de Niaréla players
Association football midfielders
Association football fullbacks
Mali international footballers
21st-century Malian people
Mali A' international footballers
2016 African Nations Championship players